Oh, Manhattan  is a post-hardcore band from Georgia.  Previously signed to Indianola Records

History
Oh, Manhattan originally formed in 2009 in the suburbs of Atlanta, Georgia, United States, by members of various local acts. The name "Oh, Manhattan" was derived from a song written by original vocalist Donny Thomas about The Manhattan Project . Their first self-released EP was entitled "We're All Sons Of Bitches Now" which was a play on words spoken by Kenneth Bainbridge in reference to the first atom bomb. After a series of member changes the band released their second EP, "The Anti Davinci", and were soon noticed by Matt Shelton of Indianola Records. Oh, Manhattan would go on to release an album entitled Spiritual Warfare on Indianola Records.

Band members
Donny Thomas – lead vocals (2009-2011, 2013–present)
Hance Alligood – lead vocals (2009–2011, 2019–present)*
Cody Gray– guitar (2009–present)
Chris Branton – guitar (2009–present)

Related projects
Current musical projects involving past and present members of the band are:
Woe, Is Me (Hance Alligood)
Capture (Erik Vaughn Weatherford)
American Prophet (Donny Thomas)
Vatican (Thomas Lovejoy)

Discography
 We're All Sons Of Bitches Now (2009) (Self Released)
 The Anti Davinci EP (2010) (Self Released)
 ''Spiritual Warfare" (2011) (Indianola Records)

References

External links

American post-hardcore musical groups
Rock music groups from Georgia (U.S. state)
Indianola Records artists